"Never" is a song by American rock band Heart, released as the second single from the band's eponymous eighth studio album (1985). It was written by Holly Knight, Gene Bloch and "Connie" (a pseudonym for Ann Wilson, Nancy Wilson, and Sue Ennis).

"Never" is a rock song with an uplifting lyric to a person who has been discouraged by love. Like the preceding "What About Love", the music video for "Never" received heavy rotation on MTV.

"Never" peaked at number four on the Billboard Hot 100, marking the first time that Heart earned consecutive top ten entries, and the first time a Heart album generated two top ten singles.

A reworking of the song appears on the Japanese version of Heart's live album The Road Home. "Only in that version of 'Never'," observed Nancy Wilson, "did the song get the rootsy vibe that stands up to time."

Reception
Cash Box said it is "a slow driving ballad" that has "a succinct arrangement and production."  Billboard called it "crisply buoyant power rock."

Remixes
Alternate mixes of "Never" and "Nothin' at All" appear in their music videos and on their seven-inch single incarnations. These mixes were included in some early releases of the Heart album, on LP, CD, or cassette. One may get a copy with both songs in their original mixes; both in their alternate mixes, or only one song in a different mix. Copies with serial No. SL-12410, for example, features the alternate mix for "Never", but the original mix for "Nothin' at All". The two versions of "Nothin' at All" differ greatly, but the mixes of "Never" are quite similar. The original album mix was featured on the "Essentials" collection.

Charts

Weekly charts

Year-end charts

Notes

References

1985 singles
1985 songs
Capitol Records singles
Heart (band) songs
Song recordings produced by Ron Nevison
Songs written by Ann Wilson
Songs written by Holly Knight
Songs written by Nancy Wilson (rock musician)